Snowboarding was one of the competitions at the 2022 Winter Paralympics in Beijing, China. In total, eight medal events were held.

Classification 

Para-snowboarding is divided into three classification categories.

 SB-LL1  Athletes competing in the class SB-LL1 have significant impairment to one leg, such as amputation above the knee, or "a significant combined impairment in two legs", affecting their balance, their board-control and their ability to navigate uneven terrain. Athletes with annotations will use prostheses during racing. There were no events for female athletes in the category SB-LL1 at the 2022 Winter Paralympics.
 SB-LL2  Athletes competing in the class SB-LL2 have impairment to one or both legs "with less activity limitation", such as below-knee amputation.
 SB-UL  Athletes competing in the class SB-UL have upper limb impairments, affecting balance. There were no events for female athletes in the category SB-UL at the 2022 Winter Paralympics.

SB-LL1 was removed from the programme for female athletes in June 2019 as an insufficient number of athletes competed in this class at the 2019 World Para Snowboard Championships. In January 2022, American snowboarder Brenna Huckaby, classified as SB-LL1 snowboarder, won a court decision to allow her to compete at the 2022 Winter Paralympics. French snowboarder Cécile Hernandez learned days before her competition that she was also allowed to compete. They competed in SB-LL2 classified events.

Medal summary

Medal table
The ranking in the table is based on information provided by the International Paralympic Committee (IPC) and will be consistent with IPC convention in its published medal tables. By default, the table will be ordered by the number of gold medals the athletes from a nation have won (in this context, a "nation" is an entity represented by a National Paralympic Committee). The number of silver medals is taken into consideration next and then the number of bronze medals. If nations are still tied, equal ranking is given and they are listed alphabetically by IPC country code.

Women's events

Men's events

See also
Snowboarding at the 2022 Winter Olympics

References

External links
 2022 Winter Paralympics Qualification Regulations
 Results book

 
2022
2022 Winter Paralympics events
Winter Paralympics
Snowboarding in China